Robert Wood may refer to:

Art
 Robert E. Wood (painter, born 1971), Canadian landscape artist
 Robert William Wood (1889–1979), American landscape artist
 Robert Wood (artist), accused and acquitted of the Camden Town murder

Military
 Robert B. Wood (1836–1878), American Civil War sailor and Medal of Honor recipient
 Robert E. Wood (1879–1969), American soldier and businessman
 Robert J. Wood (1905–1986), U.S. Army general

Politics
 Robert Wood (antiquarian) (1717–1771), English civil servant and politician
 Sir Robert Wood (mayor), English politician, mayor of Norwich
 Robert James Wood (1886–1954), Canadian politician, member of the House of Commons
 Robert Wood (American politician) (1885–1964), American politician, Wisconsin State Assemblyman
 Robert Wood (1844–?), African American mayor in Natchez, Mississippi and the first in the United States
 Robert Wood (Australian politician) (born 1949), British-born Australian politician, senator for New South Wales
 Robert A. Wood, American diplomat

Science and math
 Robert Wood (mathematician) (1622–1685), English mathematician
 Robert W. Wood (1868–1955), American physicist and writer
 Robert Wood (psychologist) (born 1941), British psychologist and writer
 Robert Wood (roboticist), Harvard University professor and innovator in robotics

Other
 Robert Wood (sailor) (1926–2004), American Olympic sailor
 Robert Wood (timber merchant) (1792–1847), claimed to be the son of Prince Edward Augustus of the U.K.
 Robert Wood (rugby) (1872–1928), rugby league footballer who played in the 1890s
 Robert Wood (rugby union, born 1948), rugby union player for Australia
 Robert Stanford Wood (1886–1963), civil servant and educational administrator
 Robert Coldwell Wood (1923–2005), American political scientist and academic
 Robert S. Wood (born 1936), American military leader and Mormon leader
 Robert Wood (television executive) (1925–1986), American television executive
 Robert Watson Wood (1923–2018), American clergyman, LGBT rights activist, and author

See also
Bob Wood (disambiguation)
Bobby Wood (disambiguation)
Robert Wood Johnson (disambiguation)
Robert Woods (disambiguation)